Monokklisia is a village in Kapetan Mitrousi, Serres regional unit, northern Greece. In Monokklisia gender equality has been achieved due to the special ancient custom of gynecocracy (γυναικοκρατία), that takes place every year on January 8.

References

Populated places in Serres (regional unit)